Solly Yach (12 September 1927 – 30 May 1993) was a South African water polo player. He competed in the men's tournament at the 1952 Summer Olympics.

References

External links
 

1927 births
1993 deaths
South African male water polo players
Olympic water polo players of South Africa
Water polo players at the 1952 Summer Olympics
Place of birth missing